Keke Maximilian Topp (born 25 March 2004) is a German footballer who plays as a forward for Bundesliga club Schalke 04.

Club career
After playing youth football for hometown club TSV Gnarrenburg, he signed for Werder Bremen's academy in summer 2013. In March 2021, it was announced that Topp would join Schalke 04's under-19 team from summer 2021. After six goals in 13 games for the under-19s, he was called up to Schalke's first team for the fixture against FC St. Pauli on 4 December 2021 due to injuries to Simon Terodde and Marius Bülter. He made his debut as a late substitute as Schalke lost 2–1.

International career
Topp made two appearances for the Germany under-16 team in September 2019. He scored four goals in his first two appearances for the Germany under-19 team in the European Championship qualification in September 2022.

Career statistics

References

External links

2004 births
Living people
German footballers
Germany youth international footballers
Association football forwards
FC Schalke 04 players
2. Bundesliga players